The Ultravia Pelican is the name given to two series of high-wing, single-engine, tractor configuration ultralight aircraft that were designed by Jean Rene Lepage and produced in kit form for amateur construction by Ultravia Aero International of Mascouche, Quebec and later Gatineau, Quebec.

Design and development
The first Le Pelican was designed as a single-seat aircraft powered by a two-cylinder  Briggs & Stratton four-stroke lawnmower engine. It was designed in the early 1980s and greatly resembles the Aeronca C-2 of 1929.

The original Le Pelican airframe is constructed from aluminum tubing, using gussets and pop rivets. The wing consists of a "D" cell with foam and aluminum ribs. All flying surfaces are covered in doped aircraft fabric. The very first Pelicans had wire-bracing for the wing and spoilers for roll control. These were replaced with strut-bracing and one-third span ailerons. The enclosed cabin, designed for Quebec winters included Lexan doors. The Pelican's conventional landing gear consists of a fibreglass rod for the main gear, with a tailskid, replaced on later models by a steerable tailwheel.

The single-seat Le Pelican production ran from 1983 to 1985, with about 100 kits delivered. Due to demand for two-seaters Lepage designed a new "clean-sheet" aircraft in 1984, which retained the same name as the earlier single-seater. The two-seat Pelican Club and its derivatives were built in large numbers, with more than 700 flying by 2003. The original Pelican Club has a fibreglass fuselage and aluminum frame wings with aircraft fabric covering. The wings were later made all-metal and this model became the Pelican PL. The PL was available from the factory equipped with a  Rotax 912ULS or a  Rotax 914 turbocharged engine. Options included tricycle or conventional landing gear.

The Pelican was initially produced in kit form by Ultravia of Mascouche, Quebec. The company later relocated to Gatineau, Quebec. The single-seat Le Pelican series was produced from 1983–85 and the two-seat Pelican series was built from 1985 until Ultravia went out of business in 2006.

In 1994, the Brazilian company Aerodesign certified and produced a new version of the Pelican PL and the Pelican Club, designated the Aerodesign AD2000 Pegasus under the National Civil Aviation Agency of Brazil H.03 program, although the approval is currently listed as "cancelled". In 1997 the company marketed this model as the Aerodesign Pegasus. In 1999 this model was listed as eligible to be sold as a kit in Australia by the Australian Ultralight Federation.

Since 2001 the Brazilian company Flyer Indústria Aeronáutica has assembled and produced several other aircraft designs based on the Pelican, as the Pelican 500BR, Kolb SS and the F600NG.

Ultravia signed The New Kolb Aircraft Company as US distributor for the Pelican Sport 600 model in 2003. Kolb displayed the aircraft at Sun 'n Fun and AirVenture between 2003 and 2005. Ultravia pursued certification of the Pelican Tutor model under CAR 523 VLA, with the National Research Council conducting the test flying under contract, but Ultravia went out of business before completing certification. In 2006 Kolb purchased the assets of the bankrupt Ultravia and developed the aircraft, in partnership with Flyer Indústria Aeronáutica of Brazil into the Kolb Flyer Super Sport, based on pilot feedback gathered. The two-seat Kolb Flyer SS design was put into production in 2008.

The Flyer SS's fuselage is built from carbon fibre and weighs , while the wing is made from 6061-T6 and 2024-T3 aluminum.

In about 2007 Kolb sold the rights to produce the Pelican line to Ballard Sport Aircraft of Sherbrooke, Quebec, who presently manufacturer kits and ready-to-fly advanced ultralight aircraft.

Variants

Le Pelican
Original single-seat model, powered by a two-cylinder  Briggs and Stratton four-stroke lawnmower engine and featuring low landing gear.
Super Pelican
Improved single-seat model with higher main landing gear and powered by a  Half VW engine.
Pelican Club
Two-seat side-by-side model with fabric covered wing introduced in 1985.
Pelican PL
Two-seat side-by-side model powered by a  Rotax 912ULS or  Rotax 914 and introduced in 1991. The PL could be built as a conventional landing gear or tricycle gear aircraft, with optional skis, floats or amphibious floats available. Gross weight .
Pelican Sport
Development of the PL with a new longer span wing and a higher lift airfoil, introduced in 1998. Wing includes an STOL kit with drooping ailerons. Gross weight  for the Canadian advanced ultralight category.
Pelican Sport 600
Development of the Pelican Sport with a  gross weight for the US Light sport aircraft category. As of April 2017, the design does not appear on the Federal Aviation Administration's list of approved special light-sport aircraft.
Pelican Tutor
Proposed certified version, certification was never completed.
Flyer Super Sport (Flyer SS)
Redesigned and developed version of the Sport 600, introduced in July 2008 and produced until about 2016 by New Kolb Aircraft as a light-sport category aircraft.
Pelican AULA 600
Factory-assembled model for the Canadian AULA category.
Aerodesign Pegasus
Flyer F600NG
A lightened version of the Pelican 500BR and Kolb SS, developed to fit the new Brazilian LSA regulations.

Specifications (Le Pelican)

See also

References

External links

Ultravia archives on Archive.org

Pelican
1980s Canadian ultralight aircraft